The 2013 NCAA Division I women's basketball tournament was played from March 23 through April 9, 2013. Tennessee continued its streak of making every NCAA women's basketball tournament at 32 consecutive appearances. Kansas made the regional semifinals for the second year in a row as a double-digit seed, UConn made it into the Final Four for the sixth consecutive year, the longest such streak, and Louisville became the first team seeded lower than fourth in a region to advance to the championship game.  For the first time in tournament history, the same four teams were #1 seeds as in the previous year.

Tournament procedure

	
Pending any changes to the format, a total of 64 teams will enter the 2019 tournament. 32 automatic bids shall be awarded to each program that wins their conference's tournament. The remaining 32 bids are "at-large", with selections extended by the NCAA Selection Committee. The tournament is split into four regional tournaments, and each regional has teams seeded from 1 to 16, with the committee ostensibly making every region as comparable to the others as possible. The top-seeded team in each region plays the #16 team, the #2 team plays the #15, etc. (meaning where the two seeds add up to 17, that team will be assigned to play another).

The Selection Committee will also seed the entire field from 1 to 64.

2013 NCAA Tournament schedule and venues
The format is similar to the Men's Tournament, except that there are 64 teams; this in turn means there is no "First Four" round. Thirty-one automatic bids for conference champions and 33 at-large bids were available.

The subregionals were played from March 23 through March 26.
Sites chosen to host first- and second-round games in 2013 include:

First round and Second Rounds (Subregionals)

 March 23 and 25
 Coors Events Center, Boulder, Colorado, Host: University of Colorado
 Comcast Center, College Park, Maryland, Host: University of Maryland
 Reed Arena, College Station, Texas, Host: Texas A&M University
 St. John Arena, Columbus, Ohio, Host: Ohio State University
 Thompson-Boling Arena, Knoxville, Tennessee, Host: University of Tennessee
 United Spirit Arena, Lubbock, Texas, Host: Texas Tech University
 McCarthey Athletic Center, Spokane, Washington, Host: Gonzaga University
 Gampel Pavilion, Storrs, Connecticut, Host: University of Connecticut
 March 24 and 26
 Pete Maravich Assembly Center, Baton Rouge, Louisiana, Host: Louisiana State University
 Cameron Indoor Stadium, Durham, North Carolina, Host: Duke University
 Carver–Hawkeye Arena, Iowa City, Iowa, Host: The University of Iowa
 KFC Yum! Center, Louisville, Kentucky, Host: University of Louisville
 Bob Carpenter Center, Newark, Delaware, Host: University of Delaware
 Carnesecca Arena, Queens, New York, Host: St. John's University
 Maples Pavilion, Stanford, California, Host: Stanford University
 Ferrell Center, Waco, Texas, Host: Baylor University

Regional semifinals and finals (Sweet Sixteen and Elite Eight)

The Regionals, named for the city rather than the region of geographic importance since 2005, held from March 30 to April 2, were at these sites:

 March 30 and April 1
 Spokane Regional Spokane Veterans Memorial Arena, Spokane, Washington, Host: Washington State University
 Bridgeport Regional Webster Bank Arena at Harbor Yard, Bridgeport, Connecticut, Host: Metro Atlantic Athletic Conference and Fairfield University
 March 31 and April 2
 Norfolk Regional Ted Constant Convocation Center, Norfolk, Virginia, Host: Old Dominion University
 Oklahoma City Regional Chesapeake Energy Arena, Oklahoma City, Oklahoma, Host: Big 12 Conference

A regional had been scheduled at Sun National Bank Center in Trenton, New Jersey. However, the NCAA moved the regional to Connecticut because of a recently passed state law allowing single-game betting for professional and collegiate games.  NCAA rules do not allow tournament events to be held in states that allow single-game betting.

National semifinals and championship (Final Four and championship)
 April 7 and April 9
 Smoothie King Center, New Orleans, Louisiana (Hosts: University of New Orleans, Tulane University, and Southland Conference/Sun Belt Conference)

This is the third time that New Orleans has been selected as a women's Final Four location (previously, in 1991 and 2004) and second time at the Smoothie King Center  (previously named Kiefer Lakefront UNO Arena); the 1991 Final Four was contested at the University of New Orleans' Lakefront Arena.

Tournament records
 Points in a Final Four game—Connecticut scored 93 points against Louisville in the Championship game, tied for the second most points scored in a Final Four game
 Winning margin—Connecticut defeated Louisville 93–60 in the Championship game; the margin of 33 points is the largest in Final Four history
 Three-pointers made—Connecticut hit 13 three-pointers in the Championship game, which is the most ever made in a Final Four game
 Assists—Connecticut recorded 24 assists in the Championship game against Louisville, the most ever recorded in a Final Four game since the NCAA began recording assists in 1985. (Broken by Connecticut in 2014)
 Blocked shots—Connecticut recorded 12 blocked shots in the Championship game against Louisville; the most ever recorded in a Final Four game
 Three-pointer percentage—Breanna Stewart hit seven of her eight three-point attempts in the final two games; the percentage of 87.5% is the highest recorded in the two Final Four games

Qualified teams

Automatic qualifiers
The following teams were automatic qualifiers for the 2013 NCAA field by virtue of winning their conference's tournament (except for the Ivy League, whose regular-season champion received the automatic bid).

Tournament seeds

Kentucky vs. Navy, Oklahoma State vs. Duke, and Notre Dame vs. Iowa aired on ESPNU. Purdue vs. Louisville aired on ESPNEWS. All other first and second round games aired on ESPN2

Game summaries

Oklahoma City Regional
Almost all first-round games were won by the higher-seeded team except for Creighton, the 10 seed who upset Syracuse 61–56. The top seed, Baylor won easily, by 42 points over Prairie View A&M. The only other game within single digit margin was 6 seed Oklahoma beating Central Michigan by five points.

In the second round, three of the four games followed expectations, with the only upset being the 5 seed Louisville over 4 seed Purdue. In the third round, 2 seed Tennessee beat 6 seed Oklahoma as expected, but Louisville upset top seeded Baylor in a result some have called one of the greatest upsets in women's basketball history. Baylor won the national championship in 2012, going undefeated during the season, and had returned every starter. While they lost one game in the current regular season, point guard Odyssey Sims was injured early in that game. The team had not lost a game in two years when playing at full strength. Louisville, the third best team in the Big East, hit sixteen of 25 three-point attempts, and held Griner to 14 points, after she had averaged 33 points in the first two games.

Bracket
* – Denotes overtime period

Oklahoma City Regional

Spokane Regional

Norfolk Regional

Bridgeport Regional

Final Four – New Orleans, Louisiana

All-Tournament team
 Breanna Stewart, Connecticut
 Bria Hartley, Connecticut
 Kaleena Mosqueda-Lewis, Connecticut
 Kelly Faris, Connecticut
 Antonita Slaughter, Louisville

Game officials
 Dennis DeMayo (semifinal)
 Charles Gonzalez (semifinal)
 Felicia Grinter (semifinal)
 Dee Kantner (semifinal)
 Tina Napier (semifinal)
 Mark Zentz (semifinal)
 Denise Brooks (final)
 Lisa Mattingly (final)
 Brenda Pantoja (final)

Record by conference 
Source

 The R64, R32, S16, E8, F4, CG, and NC columns indicate how many teams from each conference were in the round of 64 (first round), round of 32 (second round), Sweet 16, Elite Eight, Final Four, championship game, and national champion, respectively.
 The America East, Atlantic Sun, Big Sky, Big South, Big West, Conference USA, Horizon, Ivy, MEAC, Metro Atlantic, Mid-American (MAC), Mountain West, Northeast, Ohio Valley, Patriot, Southern, Southland, Summit, Sun Belt, SWAC, West Coast and WAC conferences each had one representative that was eliminated in the first round.

Media coverage

Television
ESPN had US television rights to all games during the tournament. For the first and second round, ESPN aired select games nationally on ESPN, ESPNU, or ESPNews. All other games were aired regionally on ESPN or ESPN2 and streamed online via ESPN3. Most of the nation got whip-a-round coverage during this time, which allowed ESPN to rotate between the games and focus the nation on the one that was the closest. The regional semifinals were split between ESPN and ESPN2, and ESPN aired the regional finals, national semifinals, and championship match.

Studio host and analysts
Kevin Negandhi (Host)
Kara Lawson (Analyst)
Carolyn Peck (Analyst)

Commentary teams

First & Second Rounds Saturday/Monday
Marc Kestecher & LaChina Robinson – College Park, Maryland
Clay Matvick & Swin Cash – Columbus, Ohio
Bob Wischusen & Nell Fortner – Knoxville, Tennessee
Dave O'Brien & Doris Burke – Storrs, Connecticut
Mark Jones & Fran Fraschilla – Boulder, Colorado
Carter Blackburn & Maria Taylor – College Station, Texas
Cara Capuano & Stephen Bardo – Lubbock, Texas
Dave Flemming & Sean Farnham – Spokane, Washington
Sweet Sixteen & Elite Eight Saturday/Monday
Beth Mowins, Doris Burke, & Holly Rowe – Bridgeport, Connecticut
Dave Pasch, Debbie Antonelli, & LaChina Robinson – Spokane, Washington
Final Four
Dave O'Brien, Doris Burke, Rebecca Lobo, & Holly Rowe – New Orleans, Louisiana

First & Second Rounds Sunday/Tuesday
Pam Ward & Rebecca Lobo – Newark, Delaware
Joe Davis & Debbie Antonelli – Durham, North Carolina
Melissa Lee & Brooke Weisbrod – Louisville, Kentucky
Bob Picozzi & Rosalyn Gold-Onwude – Queens, New York
Tom Hart & Krista Blunk – Baton Rouge, Louisiana
Holly Rowe & Brenda VanLengen – Iowa City, Iowa
Dave Pasch & Mary Murphy – Stanford, California
Beth Mowins & Stephanie White – Waco, Texas
Sweet Sixteen & Elite Eight Sunday/Tuesday
Dave O'Brien, Stephanie White, & Jeannine Edwards – Norfolk, Virginia
Pam Ward, Rebecca Lobo, & Maria Taylor – Oklahoma City, Oklahoma
Championship
Dave O'Brien, Doris Burke, Rebecca Lobo, & Holly Rowe – New Orleans, Louisiana

Radio
Dial Global Sports had exclusive radio rights from the regional finals on through the championship.

Regional Finals Monday
John Sadak & Ann Schatz – Bridgeport, Connecticut
Roxy Bernstein & Mary Murphy – Spokane, Washington
Final Four
Dave Ryan, Debbie Antonelli, & Krista Blunk – New Orleans, Louisiana

Regional Finals Tuesday
Dave Ryan & Krista Blunk – Norfolk, Virginia
Craig Way & Ann Meyers Drysdale – Oklahoma City, Oklahoma
Championship
Dave Ryan, Debbie Antonelli, & Krista Blunk – New Orleans, Louisiana

See also
 NCAA Women's Division I Basketball Championship
 2013 NCAA Division I men's basketball tournament
 2013 National Invitation Tournament
 2013 Women's National Invitation Tournament
 2013 Women's Basketball Invitational
 2013 NCAA Division II women's basketball tournament
 2013 NCAA Division III women's basketball tournament
 2013 NAIA Division I women's basketball tournament
 2013 NAIA Division II women's basketball tournament

References

NCAA Division I Women
NCAA Division I women's basketball tournament
NCAA Division I women's basketball tournament
NCAA Division I women's basketball tournament
Basketball
UConn Huskies women's basketball
Louisville Cardinals women's basketball
Basketball in Waco, Texas
Basketball competitions in Lubbock, Texas
Basketball competitions in New Orleans
Women's sports in Louisiana
College sports tournaments in Louisiana